John Wynne (c. 1630 – 25 February 1689), of Melai, Denbighshire, was a Welsh politician.

He was a Member (MP) of the Parliament of England for Denbighshire in 1664.

References

1630 births
1689 deaths
17th-century Welsh politicians
Members of the Parliament of England (pre-1707) for constituencies in Wales
English MPs 1661–1679